Kingsway Village is located three miles south of the City of Gloucester, England, adjacent to the suburbs of Quedgeley and Tuffley. It is built upon the old RAF Quedgeley site, the development of the site was started in 2006 by several housing developers.

Kingsway comes under the town of Quedgeley, and is in the City Council Ward of Quedgeley Fieldcourt. As of 2016, under Gloucestershire County Council it is part of the ward of Kingsway.

The Kingsway Local Centre is a collection of shops in the middle of Kingsway. It is currently occupied by Tesco Express, a Coffee shop, Taylors Estate Agent, Badham Pharmacy, Kingsway Veterinary Clinic , Pizza Hut, Sue Ryder, a Marston's pub called the Barn Owl, a Chinese restaurant and takeaway (Blue Orchid)(Restaurant now closed, but the take-away is still open), an Indian takeaway (Indian Sapphire), a Fish and Chip shop, a Kebab shop and a Premier Stores, formerly a Nisa local and Laundromat. The village has 2 primary schools which are Kingsway Primary School, and Waterwells Primary Academy.

It has a very active Residents Association, started by Barry Kirby and Clive Barton in June 2008, that holds public meetings, community fun days and other local events. It also lobbies local agencies and organisations involved in the development of the area, on behalf of residents.

Many NATO military families who are now based at HQ Allied Rapid Reaction Corps in Innsworth have moved to the area.

History
The land that Kingsway was built on was formerly RAF Quedgeley between 1914 and 1995. The development of the village was started in 2006 and involved Barratt Homes, Bromford Group, Bryant Homes, David Wilson Homes, George Wimpey, Miller Homes, Persimmon plc, and Taylor Wimpey.

Kingsway Primary School was opened on 20 October 2008.

The original planning application for Kingsway consisted of 30% of social housing in the village. However, in 2009 residents were angered when a revised version of the planning application was published which included 42% social housing,. The figure however was reduced when NATO military families who are now based at HQ Allied Rapid Reaction Corps in Innsworth moved to the area, taking those properties instead.

In June/July 2011, five new units were built at the local centre. One of which became a Tesco Express and second was taken by Badham Pharmacy. On 30 January 2012, a new Marston's pub called the Barn Owl opened in the local centre.

Waterwells Primary Academy was opened in Kingsway in September 2013. On 14 October 2013, an Asda superstore was built at the entrance to the village.

The Community Centre opened, in the local centre, in September 2014. The sports pavilion opened in September 2014. In March 2015, a new restaurant and three new takeaways opened in the local centre including a Chinese restaurant & takeaway (Blue Orchid), a Fish and Chip shop, a Kebab shop, and an Indian takeaway (Indian Sapphire). These developments are part of an ongoing investment into facilities in the growing estate.

On 19 February 2018, the Rose Tree Farm restaurant, part of the Farmhouse Inns chain owned by Greene King opened in the village.

On 15 December 2018, Kingsway Surgery opened to the public.

In October 2019, Lidl announced they were opening in the village and by May 2020, this included a Puregym and B&M homestore which would be completed by September 2020.

Crime
Between July 2016 and June 2017, the number of criminal offences was 677, accounting for 33% of the crime in the Quedgeley, Kingsway and Hardwicke area. Of these 677, 56.57% were antisocial behaviour offences and 16.25% were Violent and Sexual offences. Crime rates in July 2017 have remained low compared to other neighbourhoods with the Quedgeley, Kingsway and Hardwicke area being ranked the third lowest out of twelve neighbourhoods in Gloucester for crime rates.

References

External links
 Kingsway Village

Areas of Gloucester
Villages in Gloucestershire